Cerro Cariquima is a  high volcano in the Andes. It is a sacred mountain of the territory, featuring a mountain sanctuary.

The true age of the volcano is unclear; it has a youthful appearance and a cone on the northeast flank was recorded as being active in the last 2000 years, but the appearance of the volcano is similar to other Pliocene volcanoes and no evidence of young volcanism is visible. Cariquima is located within the Pica gap which lacks young volcanism.

References 

Volcanoes of Tarapacá Region
Stratovolcanoes of Chile